Kuwait's second district consists of 13 residential areas starting from the main suburban districts of Faiha, Abdullah Al-Salem, Shamiya, Shuwaikh, Sulaibikhat and Doha. The current Speaker of National Assembly, Marzouq Al Ghanim is a member of this district.

Areas of the Second District

Mirqab
Abdullah Al-Salem
Qibla
Shuwaikh
Shamiya
Qadsiya
Mansūriya
Faiha'
Nuzha
Sulaibikhat
Doha
Granada (Kuwait)
Qairawān

References 
The areas are officially stated by Ministry of Interior circular. (The numbering above is also by the Ministry of Interior)

Politics of Kuwait
Electoral districts of Kuwait